Herbert Haigh known as Dusty Haigh (1903–1936) was an international speedway rider who rode in the earliest days of the sport in Britain.

Speedway career 
Haigh started riding in 1928 at Halifax before moving to Sheffield and Belle Vue Aces in 1930 where he won the 1930 Speedway Northern League. He finished fourth in the league averages during the 1931 Speedway Northern League season for Sheffield. In 1935, he moved from Lea Bridge to Walthamstow Wolves and made his test debut against Australia.

During the 1936 Auto-Cycle Union Cup Haigh was killed instantly after suffering a fractured skull riding at Hackney Wick Stadium on 15 May 1936, in the ACU Cup match between Hackney and West Ham. He fell when in front and heading for a fourth consecutive heat win and the riders behind were unable to avoid him. The crash was reported in most national newspapers as they focused on the fact that it had been witnessed by his wife Irene.

Personal life
Haigh and his wife Irene started a millinery business in 1932 but it went bankrupt in 1934.

References 

1903 births
1936 deaths
British speedway riders
Sheffield Tigers riders
Belle Vue Aces riders
Halifax Dukes riders